The South Eastern Region is one of five regions of Malta. The region includes the southeastern part of the main island of Malta, including the capital Valletta. The region borders the Central and Southern Regions.

It was created by the Act No. XVI of 2009 out of part of Malta Xlokk.

Subdivision

Districts
South Eastern Region includes parts of the South Eastern and Southern Harbour Districts.

Local councils
South Eastern Region includes 15 local councils:
Birgu (Città Vittoriosa) - include the area of Tal-Ħawli
Bormla (Città Cospicua) - include the area of San Ġwann t'Għuxa
Fgura - include the area of Tal-Liedna
Floriana - include the areas of Sa Maison, Balzunetta and Valletta Waterfront
Kalkara - include the areas of Rinella, Bighi, Ricasoli and Smart City Malta
Marsa - include the areas of Albert Town and Menqa
Marsaskala - include the areas of St. Thomas' Bay, Żonqor Battery and Bellavista
Marsaxlokk - include the areas of Delimara and Tas-Silġ
Paola - include the areas of Għajn Dwieli and Corradino
Senglea (Città Invicta)
Tarxien
Valletta (Città Umilissima) 
Xgħajra 
Żabbar (Città Hompesch) - include the areas of St Peter's and Bulebel iż-Żgħir
Żejtun (Città Beland) - include the areas of Bulebel, Ġebel San Martin, Bir id-Deheb, Tal-Barrani, Ħajt il-Wied and Ħal Tmin

Hamlets
St. Peter's

Regional Committee
The current South Eastern Regional Committee is made up of:

References

External links

Regions of Malta
States and territories established in 2009
2009 establishments in Malta